JS Chikuma (DE-233) is the fifth ship of the s. She was commissioned on 24 February 1993.

Construction and career
Chikuma was laid down at Hitachi Zosen Corporation Osaka Shipyard on 14 February 1991 and launched on 25 January 1992. She was commissioned on 24 February 1993 and deployed to Maizuru.

The Australian Navy destroyer HMAS Perth and the frigate HMAS Canberra, which docked at Maizuru from October 29th to November 3rd, 1993, hosted the escort ship JS Abukuma.

On June 13th, 2000, she was transferred to the 25th Escort Corps of the Ominato District Force in place of the training ship JS Akigumo, and her homeport was transferred from Maizuru to Mutsu.

From May 11th to May 15th, 2012, she and the French Navy information gathering ship Dupuy de Lôme participated in exercises at Hakodate Port.

At around 15:40 on November 22, 2018, she was firing her high-performance Phalanx CIWS cannon on the deck about 130 km off Kumejima, Okinawa Prefecture, heavy seas caused the misfire of 21 rounds. The still live ammunition was dropped into the sea, and there were no injuries.

Gallery

Citations

External links

1992 ships
Abukuma-class destroyer escorts
Ships built by Hitachi Zosen Corporation